Orta Salahlı is a village and municipality in the Qazakh District of Azerbaijan.  It has a population of 1,588.

References 

Populated places in Qazax District